Jalāl al-Dīn Ḥassan III (1187–1221), son of Nūr al-Dīn Muḥammad II, was the 25th Nizari Isma'ili Imām. He ruled from 1210 to 1221.

His life
He was born to the 24th Imam and a Sunni mother. Jalal al-Din Hassan claimed to have converted to Sunni Islam, which was accepted by Abbasid Caliph al-Nasir and other Muslim princes and he became known as naw-musalman ("Muslim convert"). He repudiated the faith and policies associated with earlier Lords of Alamut and went so far as to curse his ancestors and burn the books of Hasan ibn Sabah. 
He invited many Sunni scholars and jurists from across Khurasan, Qazvin and Iraq to visit Alamut Castle, and even invited them to inspect the library and remove any books they found to be objectionable.  He also instructed these scholars to teach his followers, whom he commanded to observe the Sunni Sharia. However, his conversion has been interpreted by some as an act of taqiyya. 

During his lifetime, he maintained friendly relations with the `Abbasid Caliph al-Nasir. An alliance with the caliph of Baghdad meant greater resources for the self-defence of not only the Nizārī Ismā'īlī state, but also the broader Muslim world. He also personally led his army to assist Uzbek, ruler of the Eldiguzids, against a rebel.

He died in 1221, possibly the result of poisoning. He was married to four Sunni women from the daughters of the princes of Gilan, after he sought the princes' permission, who then asked the Abbasid Caliph, who approved. They, along with some of Ḥassan III's kinsfolk, including his sister, were executed by his son's vizier under allegations of poisoning Ḥassan III.

His Sunni conformity was gradually reversed and his community increasingly regarded itself openly as Ismaili Shiite during the Imamate of his only surviving son and successor, ʻAlāʼ ad-Dīn Muḥammad III, who succeeded him at the age of 9 years old. However, his son upon succession was initially too young, so Ḥassan III's vizier controlled the state.

See also
 Alamut
 Alamut Castle
 Lambasar Castle
 Nizārī Ismā'īlī state
 List of Ismaili Imams
 Nūru-d-Dīn Muḥammad II
 Fatimids
 Isma'ilism
 Nizari
 Aga Khan

Further reading
 John Malcolm, Jalālu-d-Dīn Ḥassan III in "History of Persia", 1st vol., p. 405, London, 1815.
 JALALUDDIN HASAN (607-618/1210-1221)

References

External links
 JALALUDDIN HASAN (607-618/1210-1221)

Nizari imams
Converts to Sunni Islam from Shia Islam
1187 births
1221 deaths
13th-century Ismailis
13th-century Islamic religious leaders